Idiophantis maelamunensis is a moth of the family Gelechiidae. It is found in Thailand.

References

Moths described in 1993
Idiophantis